Mal Molla (also Romanized as Māl Mollā; also known as Mālmūlā-ye Bālā and Māl Mūlā-ye ‘Olyā) is a village in Tayebi-ye Garmsiri-ye Shomali Rural District, in the Central District of Landeh County, Kohgiluyeh and Boyer-Ahmad Province, Iran. At the 2016 census, its population was 513 persons.

References 

Populated places in Landeh County